Local government elections took place in London, and some other parts of the United Kingdom on Thursday 2 May 2002. Ward changes took place in every borough, following a series of reviews and 32 statutory instruments which reduced the total number of councillors by 56 from 1,917 to 1,861.

All London borough council seats were up for election. The London Conservatives narrowly won the popular vote across the city by a margin of 871 votes, increased their number of councillors by 115 and won control of 4 more councils. However, London Labour won a plurality of council seats (866) and councils (15), though this was a decline from the 1,050 councillors and 18 councils they had won in 1998. It was the first time ever that a political party had won the most seats and councils in a London borough election whilst losing the London-wide popular vote.

In Hackney there was also a mayoral referendum vote.

Results summary

Turnout: 1,653,654 voters cast ballots, a turnout of 31.8% (-3.0%).

Council results

Overall councillor numbers

|}

Ward result maps

London-wide 
The map below shows the results for each ward across the whole of Greater London.

By borough

References

 
May 2002 events in the United Kingdom
2002